Hair coloring, or hair dyeing, is the practice of changing the hair color. The main reasons for this are cosmetic: to cover gray or white hair, to change to a color regarded as more fashionable or desirable, or to restore the original hair color after it has been discolored by hairdressing processes or sun bleaching.

Hair coloring can be done professionally by a hairdresser or independently at home. Today, hair coloring is very popular, with 75% of women and 18% of men living in Copenhagen having reported using hair dye (according to a study by the University of Copenhagen). At-home coloring in the United States reached $1.9 billion in 2011 and was expected to rise to $2.2 billion by 2016.

History
Diodorus Siculus, a Greek historian, described in detail how Celtic people dyed their hair blonde:
"Their aspect is terrifying... They are very tall in stature, with rippling muscles under clear white skin. Their hair is blond, but not naturally so: they bleach it, to this day, artificially, washing it in lime and combing it back from their foreheads. They look like wood-demons, their hair thick and shaggy like a horse's mane. Some of them are clean-shaven, but others—especially those of high rank—shave their cheeks but leave a moustache that covers the whole mouth...".

The dyeing of hair is an ancient art that involves treatment of the hair with various chemical compounds. In ancient times, the dyes were obtained from plants. Some of the most well known are henna (Lawsonia inermis), indigo dye, Cassia obovata, senna, turmeric and amla. Others include katam (buxus dioica), black walnut hulls, red ochre and leeks. In the 1661 book Eighteen Books of the Secrets of Art & Nature, various methods of coloring hair black, gold, green, red, yellow, and white are explained. The development of synthetic dyes for hair is traced to the 1860s discovery of the reactivity of para-phenylenediamine (PPD) with air. Eugène Schueller, the founder of L'Oréal, is recognized for creating the first synthetic hair dye in 1907. In 1947 the German cosmetics firm Schwarzkopf launched the first home color product, "Poly Color". Hair dyeing is now a multibillion-dollar industry that involves the use of both plant-derived and synthetic dyes.

Application techniques

Off-scalp 

Hair color was traditionally applied to the hair as one overall color. The modern trend is to use several colors to produce streaks or gradations, but not all work on top of a single base color. These are referred to as:

 Highlighting, where sections of hair are treated with lighteners
 Lowlighting, where sections of hair are treated with darker hair colors
 Splashlighting, a horizontal band of bleached hair from ear to ear

There are also newer coloring techniques such as ombré, shatush, balayage, airtouch, in which hair is dark on the crown and bit by bit becomes lighter toward the ends.

These are off-the-scalp techniques, and can be applied by the following methods:

 Foiling, where pieces of foil or plastic film are used to separate the hair to be colored. Employed especially when more than one color is to be applied, this method ensures that only the desired hair strands are colored, and the rest spared.
 Cap, when a plastic cap is placed tightly on the head and strands are pulled through with a hook, a method infrequently practiced other than for applying highlights to short hair.
 Balayage, where hair color is painted directly onto sections of the hair with no foils used to keep the color contained, a method growing in popularity due to its observed effect of appearing more natural. The difference between balayage and ombré is that a balayage requires more precise hand-painting sections of hair and typically costs more. 
 Baby lights, very thin highlights that are created by using a fine color technique, baby light results are very natural and subtle.
 Dipping or tip dyeing, where tips of the hair are dipped directly into dye.

All coloring techniques can be used with any type of color. For lightening, the hair sometimes has to be bleached before coloring.

On-scalp
Hair coloring can also be applied on the scalp for a more solid level of coverage 
 Root touch-up, where color is applied only to the most recent section of re-growth (usually the first inch of hair nearest the scalp) Root touch-ups are repeated every 4–6 weeks as the natural color grows in and becomes apparent. People who color their hair to disguise gray often have these root touch-ups. 
 All-over color, where the person wants all of their hair to be a different solid color 
 Block coloring, where the person wants two or more colors applied to their hair, resulting in dimension and contrast

All coloring techniques can be used with any type of color. For lightening, the hair sometimes has to be bleached before coloring.

Types 
The four most common classifications are permanent, demi-permanent (sometimes called deposit only), semi-permanent, and temporary.

Permanent 
Permanent hair color generally contains ammonia and must be mixed with a developer or oxidizing agent in order to permanently change hair color. Ammonia is used in permanent hair color to open the cuticle layer so that the developer and colorants together can penetrate into the cortex. The developer, or oxidizing agent, comes in various volumes. The higher the developer volume, the higher the "lift" will be of a person's natural hair pigment. Someone with dark hair wishing to achieve two or three shades lighter may need a higher developer whereas someone with lighter hair wishing to achieve darker hair will not need one as high. Timing may vary with permanent hair coloring but is typically 30 minutes or 45 minutes for those wishing to achieve maximum color change.

Demi-permanent 
(24±4 shampoos typically) Demi-permanent is hair coloring that contains an alkaline agent (e.g. ethanolamine, sodium carbonate) other than ammonia, and while always employed with a developer, the concentration of hydrogen peroxide in that developer may be lower than used with a permanent hair color. These products provide almost no lightening of hair's color during dyeing, since the alkaline agents employed in demi-permanent colors are less effective in removing the natural pigment of hair than ammonia. As the result, they cannot color hair to a lighter shade than it was before dyeing and are less damaging to hair than their permanent counterpart.

Demi-permanents are much more effective at covering gray hair than semi-permanents, but less so than permanents.

Demi-permanents have several advantages as compared with permanent color. Because there is essentially no lifting (i.e., removal) of natural hair color, the final color is less uniform/homogeneous than a permanent and therefore more natural looking; they are gentler on hair and therefore safer, especially for damaged hair; and they wash out over time (typically 20 to 28 shampoos), so root regrowth is less noticeable and if a change of color is desired, it is easier to achieve. Demi-permanent hair colors are not permanent but the darker shades in particular may persist longer than indicated on the packet.

Semi-permanent 
(6±2 shampoos typically) Semi-permanent hair coloring cannot lighten the hair either; Because it involves no developer (hydrogen peroxide) or ammonia, it is thus less damaging to hair strands than their demi-permanent counterpart.

There will be subtle variations in shade across the entire head, because of hair's color and porosity along the length of a hair strand. The final color of each strand of hair will depend on its original color and porosity. This variation gives a more natural looking result than the solid all over color of a permanent. Because gray or white hairs have a different starting color than other hair, they will not appear as the same shade as the rest of the hair when treated with semi-permanent color. If there are only minimal grey/white hairs, the effect will usually be enough for them to blend in, but as the gray spreads, there will come a point where it will not be disguised as well. In this case, the move to demi-permanent as a base can be used sometimes adding highlights, to delay permanent coloring.

Semi-permanent hair color uses compounds of lower molecular weight than are found in temporary hair color dyes. These dyes are only able to wedge under the cuticle layer of the hair shaft only. For this reason, the color will survive limited washing, typically 4–8 shampoos.

Semi-permanents may still contain the suspected carcinogen p-phenylenediamine (PPD) or other related colorant carcinogens. The U.S. Environmental Protection Agency reported chronic exposure to PPD in the diet of rats and mice depressed body weight of the animals, with no other clinical signs of toxicity observed in several studies.

Temporary color
Temporary hair color is available in various forms including rinses, shampoos, gels, sprays, and foams. Temporary hair color is typically brighter and more vibrant than semi-permanent and permanent hair color. It is most often used to color hair for special occasions such as Christmas and Halloween costume parties.

The pigments in temporary hair color are high molecular weight and cannot penetrate the cuticle layer. The color particles remain adsorbed (closely adherent) to the surface of the hair shaft and are easily removed with a single shampooing. Temporary hair color can persist on hair that is excessively dry or damaged in a way that allows for migration of the pigment to the interior of the hair shaft.

Alternative color

Alternative hair coloring products are designed to create hair colors not typically found in nature. These are also referred to as "vivid color" in the hairstyling industry. The available colors are diverse, such as the colors green and fuchsia.
Permanent alternatives in some colors are available. More recently, blacklight-reactive hair dyes have been brought to market that fluoresce under blacklights, such as those often used at nightclubs.

The chemical formulae of alternative color dyes typically contain only tint and have no developer. This means that they will only create the bright color of the packet if they are applied to light blond hair. Darker hair (medium brown to black) would need to be bleached in order for these pigment applications to take to the hair desirably. Some types of fair hair may also take vivid colors more fully after bleaching. Gold, yellow and orange undertones in hair that has not been lightened enough can muddy the final hair color, especially with pink, blue and green dyes. Although some alternative colors are semi-permanent, such as blue and purple, it could take several months to fully wash the color from bleached or pre-lightened hair.

Hair bleaching 

Hair is given a lighter color by bleaching it. Melanin pigments, which give hair a darker color, can be broken down with oxidation. The oxidizing agent used to bleach hair is hydrogen peroxide. It is mixed with ammonia to create an alkaline solution and to speed up the reaction. When melanin is oxidized, oxygen gas is released.

Products for bleaching one's hair at home usually contain a 6% solution of hydrogen peroxide, while products for use in a hair salon can contain up to 9%.

Peroxide bleached hair can have undesirable brassy or yellow hue. A product known as a toner is used to slightly alter the hair color's undertones. Purple shampoo (shampoo with purple coloring agents) can also be used to counteract brassy undertones.

Maintaining hair color 
There are many ways that people can maintain their hair color, such as:
 Using color-protecting shampoos and conditioners
 Using sulfate-free shampoo
 Using purple shampoos and conditioners to maintain or enhance the blond color in their hair
 Using leave-in treatments with UV absorbents
 Getting deep-conditioning treatments to smooth and add luster 
 Avoiding chlorine
 Using heat protecting products before using styling appliances

Adverse effects 
Hair coloring involves the use of chemicals capable of removing, replacing, and/or covering up pigments naturally found inside the hair shaft. Use of these chemicals can result in a range of adverse effects, including temporary skin irritation and allergy, hair breakage, skin discoloration and unexpected hair color results. According to the International Agency for Research on Cancer (IARC), in vitro and in vivo studies (in exposed human populations) have shown that some hair dyes and many chemicals used in the hair dyeing process can be considered mutagenic and carcinogenic.

Skin irritation and allergy
In certain individuals, the use of hair coloring can result in allergic reactions and/or skin irritation. Individuals allergic to gluten for example, will need to be cautious when purchasing hair color since certain hair dye includes gluten. Gluten does not need to be ingested for it to cause an allergy. Skin contact with gluten may cause a reaction; therefore, leading to an allergy. Symptoms of these reactions can include redness, sores, itching, burning sensation and discomfort. Symptoms will sometimes not be apparent immediately following the application and processing of the tint, but can also arise after hours or even a day later.

To help prevent or limit allergic reactions, the majority of hair color products recommend that the client conduct a patch test before using the product. This involves mixing a small quantity of tint preparation and applying it directly to the skin for a period of 48 hours. If irritation develops, manufacturers recommend that the client not use the product.

European dermatologists have, however, strongly advised against such pre-use testing, as it entails additional sensitisation (allergy) risk and the interpretation by lay people may not be sufficiently accurate.

Skin discoloration
Skin and fingernails are made of a similar type of keratinized protein as hair. That means that drips, slips and extra hair tint around the hairline can result in patches of discolored skin. This is more common with darker hair colors and persons with dry absorbent skin. That is why it is recommended that latex or nitrile gloves be worn to protect the hands.

This discoloration will disappear as the skin naturally renews itself and the top layer of skin is removed (typically takes a few days or at most a week). Ways of preventing skin discoloration are to wear latex or nitrile gloves to protect the hands and also by applying a thin layer of petroleum jelly or oil-based preparation around the hairline. Gentle abrasives such as moist baking soda or a small amount of toothpaste applied with a toothbrush may also help remove the uppermost layer of skin and dye (neither removes just the dye). Acetone and nail polish remover are not considered effective; laundry detergent may sometimes work as may moist cigarette ash rubbed into the stained area.

Unintended results

Several factors influence the final color of the hair following the coloring process.

 For semi-permanent and demi-permanent color, the final color is a blend of the natural color of the hair and the dye color.
 Bleached hair will often require pre-pigmentation before a color application. Dyeing bleached hair brown can result in grey or very ashy (grey sheen) hair.
 Previously color treated hair can react unpredictably with subsequent color treatments.
 Previous use of shampoos which deposit a layer of plastic on the hair can block the action of the dye.
 Presence of minerals, salts, chlorine or other contaminants in the water used in the coloring process
 Certain prescription drugs can alter hair chemistry
 Coloring dark hair to achieve a desirable shade of blond requires bleaching, followed by a secondary color treatment. Bleached hair can still have a yellow or coppery shade. A violet-based color can cancel out yellow tones, and a blue-based shade will cancel out coppery orange.
 Porosity of hair can affect the final shade. Porous hair often absorbs more color, which sometimes results darker than expected

Health concerns
 The salt lead acetate (formerly the active ingredient in gradual darkening products such as Grecian formula) is toxic. Lead acetate trihydrate has also been shown to cause reproductive toxicity.
 Articles link the development of some forms of cancer (including leukemia, non-Hodgkin's lymphoma, bladder cancer, blood cancer, and multiple myeloma) with use of hair color. More specifically, prolonged use of permanent dark hair dyes can double a person's risk of getting some types of blood cancer.
In 2004 a known human carcinogen, 4-aminobiphenyl or 4-ABP, was found in some commercial hair dyes. However, evidence is limited and inconsistent for the link between cancer from hair dye.
Phenylenediamine is known to cause health concerns, such as skin irritation. Exposure to phenylenediamine can occur during manufacturing or during the use of hair dyes. According to the Product Safety Summary Sheet by DuPont, Para-Phenyenediamine (PPD) is labeled as toxic and can cause adverse effects on aquatic organisms and could cause long-term effects in aquatic environments.
In October 2017, the leading breast surgeon Professor Kefah Mokbel published a meta-analysis showing that use of hair dyes might increase the risk of developing breast cancer by 20% among users.

Chemistry of permanent hair coloring
Permanent hair coloring requires three components: (1) 1,4-diaminobenzene (historically) or 2,5-diaminotoluene (currently), (2) a coupling agent, and (3) an oxidant. The process is typically performed under basic conditions. The mechanism of oxidation dyes involves three steps:
1) Oxidation of 1,4-diaminobenzene derivative to the quinone state.
2) Reaction of this diimine with a coupler compound (more detail below).
3) Oxidation of the resulting compound to give the final dye.

The preparation (dye precursors) is in the leuco (colorless) form. Oxidizing agents are usually hydrogen peroxide, and the alkaline environment is usually provided by ammonia. The combination of hydrogen peroxide and ammonia causes the natural hair to be lightened, providing a "blank canvas" for the dye. Ammonia opens the hair shaft pores so that the dye can actually diffuse inside the fiber. These dye intermediates and coupler compounds can undergo oxidation and coupling reaction as shown in the scheme below to form high molecular weight products, which are trapped in the hair matrix and cannot be readily removed through washing.

Various combinations of primary intermediates and coupler compounds provide a spectrum of shades of hair colors. The primary intermediates are aromatic para compounds, such as 1,4-diaminobenzene or 4-aminophenol. The coupler compounds (couplers) are meta-substituted derivatives of aniline. They come in three major classes based on the color that they produce when they react with the primary intermediate.

Blue couplers include 1,3-diaminobenzene and its derivatives.
Red couplers include phenols and naphthols, such as 3-aminophenol (CAS#591-27-5), 5-amino-2-methylphenol (CAS#2835-95-2) and 1-naphthol (CAS#90-15-3). The combination of 2,5-diaminotoluene with the coupler 3-aminophenol gives a magenta-brown dye, while the combination of 2,5-diaminotoluene with the coupler 1-naphthol gives a purple dye.
Yellow-green couplers include resorcinol, 4-chlororesorcinol, and benzodioxoles. These compounds produce broad-band absorption when they react to form dyes, allowing for more natural-looking hair colors. The combination of 2,5-diaminotoluene with the coupler resorcinol gives a greenish brown dye.
						
The first step shows the oxidation of p-phenylenediamine to the quinonediimine (C6H4(NH)2):

This species exists in equilibrium with the monoprotonated form (C6H4(NH)(NH2)+) (not shown). The second step involves the attack of this quinonediimine on the coupler. In organic chemistry, this reaction is called electrophilic aromatic substitution:

In the third and final step, the product from the quinonediimine-coupler reaction oxidizes to the final hair dye.

It was once believed that the dye forms in the above reaction bonds to hair permanently. It was later shown that the main reason that this reaction imparts a permanent color on hair is that it produces larger dye molecules, which is locked inside the hair.

Plant-based dyes
Henna is an orange dye commonly used as a deposit-only hair color whose active component, lawsone, binds to keratin. It is therefore considered semi-permanent to permanent, depending on a person's hair type. Most people will achieve a permanent color from henna, especially after the second dye. With repeated use the orange color builds up into red and then auburn. While "natural" henna is generally a red color, variations exist. These variations usually contain ingredients from other plants and even synthetic dyes.

Indigo is natural dye from a plant (Indigofera tinctoria, I. suffructicosa, or I. arrecta) that can be added to henna or layered on top of it to create brown to black colors in the hair. Henna is orange, and indigo is blue, so as complementaries on a standard color wheel, the two colors' combined effect is to create brown tones. Like henna, indigo may fade after one application, but it becomes permanent on the hair with repeated use.

Using a plant-based color such as henna can cause problems later when trying to do a perm or permanent hair color. Some store-bought henna contains metallic salts which reacts to hydrogen peroxide that is used in hair lightening. This may lead to unpredictable results, such as green or blue tones in the hair. Henna is a healthy way to color hair, as long as no metallic salts are used.

In 2018, a system for making semi-permanent hair dyes from renewable waste blackcurrant (Ribes nigrum L.) fruit skins from the fruit pressing industry was developed. Anthocyanin pigments were extracted from the blackcurrant skin waste and formulated into hair dyes. The dyes showed high buildup on hair and gave an intense blue color, which was stable to multiple washes.

Nanomaterial dyes 
In the late 2010s and early 2020s, researchers at Northwestern University have explored potential alternative forms of hair dye using nanotechnology. Concepts using graphene oxide and synthetic melanin nanoparticles have been tested; however, neither has been released commercially.

Legal restrictions 
Hair dyes are cosmetic compounds that make contact with the skin during application. Because of this skin contact, there exists some health risk associated with use of hair dyes. Thus, hair dyes are regulated in the commercial marketplace and, as new toxicity data is generated for some hair dyes and health risks are discovered, some of these hair dyes are being legally restricted from the cosmetic marketplace.

The European Union is particularly stringent with regard to health regulations. To ensure that hair dyes contain only safe substances, the European Commission adopted the Directive 2012/21/EU to restrict the use of around 45 chemicals in hair dyes. The directive on dyes is part of a general and comprehensive set of regulations, the EU Cosmetics Directive 76/768/EC.

Religion 
For Muslims, if a man is not of advanced age, there is no harm in his using black dye. Some of the early Muslims, including some sahabah, permitted the use of black dye. As narrated in a hadith, the best thing with which to dye gray hair is henna and katam (a plant from Yemen which colors it black tinged with red).

See also
 Human physical appearance
 Hairstyle
 Hair highlighting
 Punk fashion
 Chapatsu

References

External links